Shaykh Muhammad Sarwar (Arabic: محمد سرور), is a Pakistani-born American Islamic scholar specializing in Islamic theology and philosophy. He is also known as the first representative of the late Ayatollah Abul-Qasim al-Khoei to the Shia Muslims of North America. His works include the first contemporary English translation of the Quran (1982), currently its sixth edition (2011), and books about Islam. In recent years, his primary focus has been the translation of Islamic ahadith from Kitab al-Kafi (eight volumes) and Bihar al-Anwar.

Education
1963 Mashad Seminary, Iran. Lagha and Basic Aqaid.
1964-1967  Jamia Imamia Nazim, Karachi, Pakistan. He studied the topics of Mantiq, Tafsir al-Quran, `Ulum al-Quran, Tarikh, Aqid, Kalam, Lugha and Falsafa.  The principal at the time was Muhammad Mustafa Jauhar. He also studied Arabic languages at Karachi University.
1968-1969 Qom Seminary, Iran. Study of Usul.
1969-1975 Hawza `ilmiyya Najaf (Seminary of Najaf), Iraq. He resumed studies on Usul al-Fiqh, Fiqh, `ilm al-Hadith, `ilm ar-Rijal. He started working in the offices of Abu-al-Qasim al-Khoei translating English correspondences for al-Khoei and works while studying Sotooh, `Uloom, Bahath Kharij.

Selection as Representative of Marja' for North America 
While working in the offices of Abu-al-Qasim al-Khoei, Sarwar worked closely with Murtadha Nakshawani and Murtadha Khallkali in the early days of al-Khoei's tenure. While each one's responsibilities were based on ability, Sarwar started translating English correspondence for al-Khoei to read, while at the same time translating al-Khoei's works to English. He did this as he continued his religious studies in advanced topics. With increasing Shia converts and numbers of Shia immigrating to North America, the need of an official representative physically present in North America was acknowledged by al-Khoei. With full support from the members of the office and al-Khoei himself, al-Khoei promoted Sarwar to be his representative to North America.

Moving to the United States 
Reaching the United States proved to be challenging. Funded by the office of al-Khoei he traveled to Lebanon planning to apply for a visa at the US Embassy in Beirut. He found the atmosphere tense with the ongoing civil war between the Kataeb (a Christian political party) who were targeting Muslims and the supporters/sympathizers of the PLO.

While en route to Beirut he shared a taxi with a local family. One of the sons  recognized an unusual detour being taken by the taxi driver. The driver was asked to stop and started to drive at excessive speeds through local roads, raising fear of a possible kidnapping. One of the passengers managed to subdue the driver, allowing for everyone to escape.

After this incident Sarwar decided to apply at the US embassy in Damascus, Syria. With one of the many letters expressing some excitement regarding his anticipated arrival to the United States, an application for a visa was approved after three months. He arrived in New York City on January 25, 1975 and started his assessment of the Shia communities and their needs. By 1978, with full support of Marja', the Islamic Seminary was operating the first Shia Center in the United States in Woodside Queens, New York.

Works 
Complete Idiot's Guide to the Koran, with co-author Brandon Togorov, New York City 2003 
The Holy Qur'an: The Arabic Text and English Translation, 1982 
The Holy Quran: The Arabic Text and English Translation, 2011 
The Holy Quran: The Arabic Text and English Translation – online edition, 2011 
The Holy Qur'an: The Arabic Text and English Translation – e-book, 2011 
Kitab al-Kafi: Volumes 1 – 8 – e-book, 2013 
Bihar al-Anwar: Fatimah al-Zahra (SA) Volume 43, 2014 
Bihar al-Anwar: Hasayn ibn-Ali (AS) Volume 44 & 45, 2014
The Cow: Commentaries on Selected Chapters of the Qur'an 
The Last Section of the Qur'an: Commentaries on Selected Chapters of the Qur'an

External links
The Islamic Seminary

References 

Living people
20th-century Muslim scholars of Islam
Year of birth missing (living people)
American scholars of Islam